William Osborne or Osborn may refer to:

 William Osborne (umpire), National League umpire in 1876
 William H. Osborne (born 1960), president and CEO of Federal Signal Corporation
 William Osborne (born 1960), English writer 
 William G. Osborne, respondent in District Attorney's Office v. Osborne, a U.S. Supreme Court case
 Will Osborne (rugby) (1875–?), Welsh rugby player
 Qwominer William Osborne, British Virgin Islands politician
 William Osborn (Medal of Honor) (1837–1887), American soldier and Medal of Honor recipient
 William A. Osborn (born 1947), American bank executive
 William Church Osborn (1862–1951), New York State Democratic Committee Chairman, 1914–1916
 William H. Osborn (1821–1894), American railroad tycoon
 Sir William Osborne, 8th Baronet (?–1783), Irish baronet and politician
 William Evelyn Osborn (1868–1906), British artist
 Bill Osborne (born 1955), New Zealand rugby player
 Will Osborne (singer) (1905–1981), Canadian singer

See also
William Osbourne (disambiguation)